Jarreh or Jarrah may refer to:
 Jarreh-ye Olya
 Jarreh-ye Mian